The Pan American Journal of Public Health (Spanish: Revista Panamericana de Salud Pública; Portuguese: Revista Pan-Americana de Saúde Pública) is a peer-reviewed open-access public health journal covering research and case studies on issues of public health significance, mainly in areas related to national and local health systems, to improve the health of the peoples of the Americas. The journal is published monthly by the Pan American Health Organization, a regional office of the World Health Organization. Articles are published in English, Portuguese, and Spanish.

Abstracting and indexing 
The journal is abstracted and indexed in PubMed, SciELO, Web of Science, Social Sciences Citation Index, Current Contents/Social & Behavioral Sciences, EMBASE, Global Health, Tropical Diseases Bulletin, Nutrition Abstracts and Reviews, Abstracts on Hygiene and Communicable Diseases, and Review of Medical and Veterinary Entomology. According to the Journal Citation Reports, the journal has a 2016 impact factor of 0.539.

History 
The journal was established in 1997. It was preceded by the Boletín Panamericano de Sanidad, established in 1922, and the Boletín de la Oficina Sanitaria Panamericana and its English-language counterpart, Bulletin of the Pan American Health Organization, launched in 1966.

Since July 2009, the journal is published exclusively in an electronic format, with full text of all published issues available online via SciELO.

See also
Other publications of the World Health Organization:
Bulletin of the World Health Organization
Eastern Mediterranean Health Journal
WHO South-East Asia Journal of Public Health
Human Resources for Health
World Health Report

References

External links
 

Public health journals
World Health Organization academic journals
Publications established in 1997
Multilingual journals
Monthly journals
English-language journals
Portuguese-language journals
Spanish-language journals
Academic journals published by non-profit organizations